Arlind Nora (born 4 July 1980, in Gjirokastër) is a retired Albanian footballer playing as a forward.

Career stats

Honours

Club
Elbasani

Albanian Superliga (1): 2005–06

References

1980 births
Living people
Footballers from Gjirokastër
Albanian footballers
Association football midfielders
Association football forwards
Luftëtari Gjirokastër players
KS Lushnja players
KF Elbasani players
KF Vllaznia Shkodër players
KS Shkumbini Peqin players
KF Laçi players
Besa Kavajë players
Kategoria Superiore players